Edward Yaw Okyere Asafu-Adjaye (born 22 December 1988) is an English footballer who plays for  side Royston Town, where he plays as a defender.

Career
Born in Southwark, London, Asafu-Adjaye started his career at Luton Town as a scholar, he was sent on loan to Isthmian League Premier Division side Walton & Hersham, making his debut for 'the Swans' in March 2007 and scoring in a 1–0 win over Carshalton Athletic. He went on to make seven appearances during his loan spell, playing at right-back and scoring three goals.

Asafu-Adjaye was rewarded with a one-year professional contract during the summer of 2007. Unable to break into the Luton side at the beginning of the 2007–08 season, he was instead loaned to Conference Premier side Salisbury City in January 2008 by then-Hatters manager Kevin Blackwell. He made his Salisbury debut in a 3–1 home win over Oxford United. Asafu-Adjaye continued to impress during his time with Salisbury, in which time he earned several man-of-the-match accolades.

With Luton Town in administration and heading for relegation to League Two, new manager Mick Harford decided to recall Asafu-Adjaye from his loan spell in late March, and he made his Luton Town debut in a 2–1 home victory over Crewe Alexandra just days after returning to Kenilworth Road. Operating at right-back, he went on to make seven league appearances for the Hatters as they were relegated. During the summer of 2008 he signed a new contract, despite interest from his former loan club Salisbury City.

In the 2008–09 season, Asafu-Adjaye established himself as the first choice right-back in the Luton team, and also started at centre-back in Luton's 3–2 victory over Scunthorpe United in the Football League Trophy final at Wembley Stadium. On 30 June 2009, Asafu-Adjaye agreed to a one-year contract extension, keeping him at Luton until 2011.

Out of favour at Luton, having made just two league appearances during the 2010–11 season, Asafu-Adjaye joined Histon on loan until the end of the season on 25 March 2011. He made five appearances for the Stutes, before being recalled due to an injury to full-back Fred Murray. New Luton manager Gary Brabin installed Asafu-Adjaye into the first-team as he played in a 3–0 victory over Eastbourne Borough on 23 April. He started at left-back in the crucial first leg of the play-off semi-final against Wrexham on 5 May, scoring his first goal for the club, a half-volley from 18 yards, in a 3–0 win.

On 12 July 2011, Asafu-Adjaye agreed to sign a new contract with Luton. He made thirteen appearances during the season, and on 30 April 2012 it was announced that Asafu-Adjaye was to be released from Luton.

On 2 July 2012, it was announced that Asafu-Adjaye had signed for Forest Green Rovers on a one-year contract. He made his Forest Green debut on 11 August 2012 in a 1–1 draw with Cambridge United. After an impressive opening few months at The New Lawn, he signed a contract extension that would keep him at the club until June 2014. On 28 April 2014, having made 40 league appearances in two seasons for the club, he was released along with nine other players at the end of his contract.

On 8 August 2014, Asafu-Adjaye signed for newly promoted Conference South side Hemel Hempstead Town. He made his debut for the club the next day on 9 August in a 1–0 away win over Basingstoke Town.

In the summer 2019, Asafu-Adjaye returned to Royston Town for the second time after a year at Hayes & Yeading United.

Honours
Luton Town
Football League Trophy: 2008–09

Career statistics

Footnotes

A.  The "League" column constitutes appearances and goals in the League competition.
B.  The "Other" column constitutes appearances and goals in the Football League Trophy and FA Trophy.

References

External links

1988 births
Living people
Footballers from Southwark
English footballers
Black British sportspeople
Association football defenders
Luton Town F.C. players
Walton & Hersham F.C. players
Salisbury City F.C. players
Histon F.C. players
Forest Green Rovers F.C. players
Hemel Hempstead Town F.C. players
Kings Langley F.C. players
Royston Town F.C. players
Hayes & Yeading United F.C. players
English Football League players
National League (English football) players
Southern Football League players